Baya Rahouli (born July 27, 1979 in Bab El Oued, Algiers) is an Algerian athlete who competes in the triple jump. She is a former African record holder in this event, and has two African championship titles, beating Françoise Mbango Etone and Kéné Ndoye on both occasions. In two editions of the Pan Arab Games she has taken a clean sweep, winning eight gold medals in total.

Competition record

Personal bests
Outdoor
100 metres – 11.51 s (1999) NR
100 metres hurdles – 13.50 s (1998)
Long jump – 6.70 m (1999) NR
Triple jump – 14.98 m (2005) NR

Indoor
60 metres – 7.45 (1999)
Triple Jump – 14.31 (2003, 2004) NR

External links

1979 births
Living people
Algerian female triple jumpers
Algerian female long jumpers
Athletes (track and field) at the 2000 Summer Olympics
Athletes (track and field) at the 2004 Summer Olympics
Athletes (track and field) at the 2008 Summer Olympics
Olympic athletes of Algeria
People from Bab El Oued
Algerian female hurdlers
Mediterranean Games bronze medalists for Algeria
Athletes (track and field) at the 2013 Mediterranean Games
African Games gold medalists for Algeria
African Games medalists in athletics (track and field)
Mediterranean Games medalists in athletics
Athletes (track and field) at the 1999 All-Africa Games
Athletes (track and field) at the 2011 All-Africa Games
21st-century Algerian women
20th-century Algerian women